Richard L. Hasen is an American legal scholar and law professor at the University of California, Los Angeles. He is an expert in legislation, election law and campaign finance.

Early life and education
Hasen received his Bachelor of Arts with highest honors from the University of California, Berkeley, in 1986. His Bachelor's degree is in Middle Eastern studies. He received his Master of Arts with distinction in political science in 1988 and Doctor of Philosophy in political science in 1992, both from the University of California, Los Angeles. He received his Juris Doctor from UCLA School of Law in 1991, and was elected to the Order of the Coif.

Career
Hasen was a law clerk to Judge David R. Thompson of the United States Court of Appeals for the Ninth Circuit from 1991 to 1992 before joining the law firm of Horvitz & Levy LLP, in Encino, California.

He taught at the Chicago-Kent College of Law from 1994 to 1997. In 1998 he took a position at Loyola Law School, Los Angeles; in 2005, he was named by Loyola as the William H. Hannon Distinguished Professor of Law. He left Loyola to become a professor at the University of California, Irvine School of Law in July 2011.

Hasen was one of the founding co-editors of the quarterly Election Law Journal, a peer reviewed publication on election law. He also runs ElectionLawBlog, a blog focusing on election law, campaign finance, voting rights, initiatives, redistricting, and other legal issues.

In 2009, Hasen was elected to the American Law Institute. In 2013, the National Law Journal included Hasen on its list of the "100 most influential lawyers in America."

In 2022, Hasen became a professor at the UCLA Law School.

Books

References

External links

 Profile at University of California, Irvine
 
 
 
 Election Law Blog

21st-century American lawyers
American legal scholars
Election law
Illinois Institute of Technology faculty
Living people
Loyola Marymount University faculty
University of California, Berkeley alumni
University of California, Irvine faculty
University of California, Los Angeles alumni
Year of birth missing (living people)